Kansas's 38th Senate district is one of 40 districts in the Kansas Senate. It has been represented by Republican Ron Ryckman Sr. since March 2021, following the death of incumbent Bud Estes on February 13, 2021.

Geography
District 38 is predominantly based in the two Western Kansas cities of Dodge City and Liberal, covering all of Clark, Ford, Gray, Meade, and Seward Counties and part of Hodgeman County. Other communities in the district include Cimarron, Meade, and Ashland.

The district is located entirely within Kansas's 1st congressional district, and overlaps with the 115th, 117th, 119th, 124th, and 125th districts of the Kansas House of Representatives. It borders the state of Oklahoma.

Recent election results

2020

2016

2012

Federal and statewide results in District 38

References

38
Clark County, Kansas
Ford County, Kansas
Gray County, Kansas
Hodgeman County, Kansas
Meade County, Kansas
Seward County, Kansas